Cavazzuti is an Italian surname. Notable people with the surname include:

Armando Cavazzuti (1929–2014), Italian footballer and manager
Cinzia Cavazzuti (born 1973), Italian judoka
Filippo Cavazzuti (1942–2021), Italian politician

Italian-language surnames